Pavel Kalný (14 May 1967 – 10 May 2006) was a Czech psychiatrist and mountaineer. He climbed on Mount Elbrus in 1992 and also on several mountains in the USSR. In 2005 he climbed the entire massif of Mount Logan. In 2006, together with Martin Minařík, he participated in an expedition to the fourth highest mountain in the world, Lhotse. On 9 May 2006 he survived a fall of about 200 meters, but died the following day. In April 2007, Martin Minařík placed a commemorative plaque on Lhotse.

References

See also
List of people who died climbing Mount Everest

1967 births
2006 deaths
Czech mountain climbers
Czech psychiatrists
Mountaineering deaths